Sequiwaimanu is an extinct genus of early penguin. The type species, Sequiwaimanu rosieae, was named and described by Gerald Mayr in 2018.

It is the fourth penguin species to be discovered from the Waipara Greensand in New Zealand, which originally held two species that were assigned to the taxon Waimanu. Also this penguin had leg bones similar to an unnamed giant penguin.

See also 
 2018 in paleontology
 Muriwaimanu

References 

Extinct penguins
Prehistoric bird genera
Selandian life
Paleogene birds of Oceania
Fossils of New Zealand
Fossil taxa described in 2018